The 1994–95 Hellenic Football League season was the 42nd in the history of the Hellenic Football League, a football competition in England.

Premier Division

The Premier Division featured 13 clubs which competed in the division last season, along with four new clubs.
Clubs, promoted from Division One:
Carterton Town
Highworth Town
Pegasus Juniors
Plus:
Brackley Town, transferred from the United Counties League

League table

Division One

Division One featured 15 clubs which competed in the division last season, along with five new clubs.
Clubs, demoted from the Premier Division:
Headington Amateurs
Milton United
Rayners Lane
Wantage Town
Plus:
Endsleigh, joined from the Gloucestershire County League

League table

References

External links
 Hellenic Football League

1994-95
8